China National Highway 207 (G207) runs from Ulanhot, Inner Mongolia to Hai'an, Guangdong.

Route and distance

See also
 China National Highways

References

External links
Official website of Ministry of Transport of PRC

207
Transport in Guangxi
Transport in Guangdong
Transport in Shanxi
Transport in Hubei
Transport in Hunan
Transport in Hebei
Transport in Henan
Transport in Inner Mongolia